Tårnåsen is a village in Viken, Norway.

Villages in Akershus